Seewis-Pardisla railway station is a railway station in the municipality of Seewis im Prättigau, in the Swiss canton of Grisons. It is an intermediate stop on the Rhaetian Railway  Landquart–Davos Platz line. Prior to December 2018 it was known as Seewis-Valzeina.

Services
Seewis-Pardisla is served by the S1 of the Chur S-Bahn:

 Regio:
 Limited service to Scuol-Tarasp.
 Limited service between Landquart and Davos Platz.
 Chur S-Bahn : hourly service between Rhäzüns and Schiers.

References

External links
 
 

Railway stations in Graubünden
Rhaetian Railway stations